This is a list of the National Register of Historic Places listings in Culberson County, Texas.

This is intended to be a complete list of properties and districts listed on the National Register of Historic Places in Culberson County, Texas. There are two districts and eight individual properties listed on the National Register in the county.

Current listings

The publicly disclosed locations of National Register properties and districts may be seen in a mapping service provided.

|}

See also

National Register of Historic Places listings in Guadalupe Mountains National Park
National Register of Historic Places listings in Texas
Recorded Texas Historic Landmarks in Culberson County

References

External links

Registered Historic Places
Culberson County
Buildings and structures in Culberson County, Texas